Alberto Simonelli is an Italian paralympic archer. He won the silver medal at the Men's individual compound - Open event at the 2008 Summer Paralympics in Beijing.

See also
Italy at the 2008 Summer Paralympics
Italy at the 2016 Summer Paralympics

References

Italian male archers
Living people
Paralympic bronze medalists for Italy
Paralympic archers of Italy
Archers at the 2008 Summer Paralympics
Medalists at the 2008 Summer Paralympics
Paralympic silver medalists for Italy
Year of birth missing (living people)
Medalists at the 2016 Summer Paralympics
Paralympic medalists in archery
21st-century Italian people